Minnette Vári (born 1968) is a South African artist known primarily for her video installations. Born in Pretoria, Vári studied fine arts at the University of Pretoria where she obtained her master's degree. She lives and works in Johannesburg.

Work
Vári has exhibited her work since the early nineties, participating in such group exhibitions as the Second Johannesburg Biennale (1997), the Venice Biennale (2001 and 2007), and the 10th Biennale of Havana (2009). Her solo exhibitions include a monographic solo exhibition at the Art Museum Lucerne, Switzerland (2004), Vigil at Elga Wimmer Gallery, New York (2007), Chimera at Basel Art Unlimited (2003) and most recently, Songs of Excavation at the Goodman Gallery in Johannesburg (2013). Since 1998 Vári has worked predominantly with digital media and large-scale video projections, often including performance elements by inserting her own body into reworked media and historical documentary footage. In addition, Vári regularly produces series of drawings and paintings that are thematically linked to her video projects. Her work has been associated with exhibitions and conferences exploring themes of identity and the body, transition, politics, mythology, trauma and history. Her work has been discussed in such publications as Art cities of the future, South African Art Now and 10 years 100 Artists, Art in a Democratic South Africa.

See also
Installation art
Video installation
Video Art
Painting
List of video artists

References

External links
Home Page
Goodman Gallery
UNESCO digi-arts Biography

1968 births
Living people
University of Pretoria alumni
20th-century South African women artists
21st-century South African women artists
South African contemporary artists
People from Pretoria